Boggy Peak, named Mount Obama from 2009 to 2016, is the highest point of the Shekerley Mountains on the island of Antigua.

History
The area has significant cultural heritage as it was used during slavery times for sugarcane plantations. The name originated from slave masters telling stories about the dangers of the Boogie Man who took spirits and lived up in the mountains. This was to discourage slaves from escaping and running into the mountains. Runaways were able to make their own settlements in the mountains and actually live out their lives apart from enslavement.

On August 4, 2009, the peak was renamed Mount Obama by then-Prime Minister Baldwin Spencer, after United States president Barack Obama. The original name was restored in 2016 by cabinet decision.

References

Landforms of Antigua and Barbuda
Saint Mary Parish, Antigua and Barbuda
Mountains of the Caribbean
Highest points of countries